Savatieria coppingeri is a species of sea snail, a marine gastropod mollusk in the family Buccinidae.

Description
The length of the shell attains 6⅓ mm, its diameter 2⅓ mm.

(Original description) The small shell has an elongate and subfusiform shape. It is dark purplish brown, paler at the apex. It contains 6½ whorls, divided by a deep suture ; the first 1½ forming the protoconch, large, semiglobose and smooth. The rest are slightly convex and longitudinally ribbed. The ribs are stout, broader than the interstices, suberect, a little arcuated. Those on the body whorl become obsolete a trifle below the middle, whence downward the whorl is transversely finely striated, the striae at the extremity being closer together than those above. The aperture is small, ovate, occupying about one third of the entire length. The columella is arcuate, covered with a thin callosity. The outer lip is thickened, with a very faint sinus a little below the suture. The siphonal canal is short, distinct and oblique.

Distribution
This marine species occurs off Patagonia, Chile

References

 Castellanos, Z. J. A. de & Fernández, D. E. (1975). Acerca de las especies del genero Savatieria Roch. y Mab., 1885 (Moll. Gastropoda). Neotropica. 21 (65): 57-60.

External links
 Strebel, H. (1905). Beiträge zur Kenntnis der Molluskenfauna der Magelhaen-Provinz. No. 3. Zoologische Jahrbücher, Abteilung für Systematik, Geographie und Biologie der Tiere. 22: 575-666, pls 21-24
 Di Luca J. & Pastorino G. (2018). A revision of the genus Savatieria Rochebrune & Mabille, 1885: an endemic group of buccinulid gastropods from the Magellanic region. Journal of Molluscan Studies.

coppingeri
Gastropods described in 1881
Endemic fauna of Chile